Autodynamics Inc. is a former American racecar manufacturer based in Marblehead, Massachusetts. The company mainly produced Formula Vee and Formula Ford chassis. The company was also active in the Trans-Am Series entering Dodge Challengers in the 1970 season.

History

Formula Vee beginnings
Formula Vee was announced in 1960 by the Sports Car Club of America (SCCA) and Volkswagen of America. Caldwell designed the Caldwell D-1 based on a Cooper formula car chassis and built it with help from friends. The D-1 was received well by the public and Caldwell decided to produce the car.  The D-1 was produced in 1964 and 1965 in different variants. In 1964 the SCCA included the Formula Vee class in the SCCA National Championship Runoffs. Autodynamics, along with Formcar and Zink Cars, were the pioneers of the series. Lewis Kerr won the inaugural SCCA National Championship Runoffs for Formula Vee in a Formcar, and Roger Barr finished second. Autodynamics produced a total of 478 Formula Vees. It took Autodynamics until 1972 to win a National Championship in Formula Vee. Dave Weitzenhof beat a field with many Zink and Lynx chassis. Caldwell's final FV design, the D-13, had a zero-roll-stiffness rear suspension and aerodynamic body that dominated SCCA National Races for several years. However, frequently repeated claims that Reeves Callaway won the National Championship in a D-13 in 1973 are exaggerated. Callaway did finish the race in first place, but was subsequently disqualified for illegal engine modifications.

Formula Ford
The Caldwell D-9 was the first Formula Ford chassis made in the U.S. It followed the chassis and suspension design of the British Merlin FF. Introduced for the 1969 season, a D-9 piloted by Skip Barber won the SCCA North East Division championship as well as the National Championship Runoffs. A Caldwell D-9 also won the inaugural race sanctioned by the IMSA. At Pocono Raceway Formula Ford cars ran on the 5/8-mile oval track for 200 laps. Caldwell driver Jim Clarke was declared the winner. David Loring won many FF races in a D-9, including the Ontario and Canadian Formula Ford series, as well as the IMSA Pro Series. Loring later drove the Gurney Eagle FF.

Caldwell D-7
In 1967 Autodynamics launched the Caldwell D7 built to Group 7 rules to enter the 1967 Can-Am season. Sam Posey again was the main driver for the team with Brett Lunger and Ray Caldwell driving selected rounds. The D7 made its debut at Road America where it retired with a broken half shaft. At Mosport Park Posey finished twelfth, the best result of the season. Autodynamics also entered a McLaren Mk. II when the D7 was not ready. With Posey scoring a podium at Stardust International Raceway. The D7 returned in 1968 where it finished fourth at Autódromo Hermanos Rodríguez, the first round of the 1968 United States Road Racing Championship. The following round, at Riverside Raceway, Posey improved to third, scoring the cars only podium finish. By then, the major teams had switched to big-block Chevvy and Ford alloy V8s and recognized the Autodynamics team as the fastest of the small-block cars.  The D-7 experimented with live axle suspensions, front and rear as Caldwell believed that was the optimal geometry for keeping the exceedingly wide tires flat on the track. Eventually, Posey's team abandoned the D-7 for a more conventional Lola T-160 CanAm chassis.

Formula 5000
Autodynamics had a short lived Formula 5000 project with the Caldwell D8, another unusual live axle racing design. Lunger and Posey were the drivers for the one off project. Two chassis were built. Lunger crashed the first chassis during a test, the races were done with a second chassis. In the pro-series Posey scored the best result, a seventh place at Lime Rock Park. Sam Posey went on to earn the runner-up title twice in the U.S. F/5000 series in 1971 and 1972. In 1972, he did not run the complete eight-race series but still placed second three times and third twice.

Trans-Am Series
Chrysler entered the Trans-Am Series with their two pony car types the Plymouth 'Cuda and the Dodge Challenger. The 'Cudas were entered by Dan Gurneys All American Racers as a factory funded effort. Caldwell "owned" the team/cars and was responsible for the final completion of the chassis' after receiving them from AAR (photos of the cars as-received from AAR at Caldwell's temporary Autodynamics West shop at Reath Automotive in Long Beach, Ca, Sam Posey's Mudge Pond Express page Chapter 6 page 129 and Autoweek ads for the Challengers "for sale" in the issue of 5/22/1971 confirms) versus AAR sending the 'Cudas back to Chrysler for travelling display purposes and later sold off to SCCA Club racers,  Temporary housing for all of the Autodynamics crew was set up at the Cloud Motel in Lakewood, Ca.  AAR performed all the initial engineering, modification and extensive fabrication of the body-in-white (no VIN Numbers for street use) uni-bodies, fenders, k-frame and "other" components (progress of chassis development and completion dated letter from AAR/Bob R.L. Tarozzi to Pete Hutchinson at Chrysler dated 2/2/1970 confirms). AAR sent the later production line body-in-white chasses out to have them stripped of all paint (receipt from Superior Paint Stripping Inc. Anaheim, CA dated 3-13-70 confirms).  The Cuda and Challenger chasses were sent to Aerochem, Inc in Orange, Ca for "chemmilling of .006-.007 in. per surface (see Aerochem invoice dated 11/18/69 confirms). Sam Posey was the full-time driver for the first Dodge Challenger. It has been stated that the first chassis was left in the acid too long weakening the roof and structural integrity of the car (see Chapter 6, page 135 Mudge Pond Express confirms). The car required multiple chassis repairs between races. until AAR came up with a solution to re-enforce the torsion bar areas in the floor that were tearing under hard braking and cornering forces (photos of the floor and cage re-enforcements from Chrysler Archives confirms). All chassis, braking, suspension and steering components were fabricated by AAR and sent to Caldwell (letter from Carroll Smith-Autodynamics Product Engineer letter to Bruce Junor at AAR dated 6/19/1979 confirms).  The de-stroked 340 ci based engine to 305ci Dodge V8 engines (built by Keith Black) proved unreliable due to factory lifter angles and push rod length design not conducive to high rpm racing requirements causing multiple retirements. Posey scored three podium finishes during the season accumulating all the team's points. During the last two races, at Seattle and Riverside, a second car was entered. Ronnie Bucknum and Tony Adamowicz. The second car retired in both races. 

A Mid-Season decision by Chrysler to not return in 1971 killed off the efforts (internal memorandum from Max Muhlman announcing a reorganization due to Chrysler funding cutbacks dated 5/21/1970 and Chrysler letter from Pete Hutchinson to Bruce Junor at AAR dated 10/13/1970 confirms).  Ford and Chevrolet also canceled their racing programs.

Autodynamics eventually built 3 Challengers and Black provided 12 engines during the season. The cancellation led to a financial crisis for Autodynamics which was forced to reorganize under Chapter 11, Title 11, United States Code. In 1972, Caldwell and entrepreneur Bob MacArthur launched an electric passenger car development program in an attempt to save the company. The firm converted a number of gasoline production cars to run on electric motors, but lead-acid battery technology was too heavy and inefficient for widespread acceptance.

Production

Race results

SCCA Runoffs results

Can-Am Series
(key) (Races in bold indicate pole position) (Races in italics indicate fastest lap)

SCCA Continental Championship Formula A results
(key) (Races in bold indicate pole position) (Races in italics indicate fastest lap)

Trans-Am Series results
(key) (Races in bold indicate pole position) (Races in italics indicate fastest lap)

References

American racecar constructors
Automotive motorsports and performance companies
Sports car manufacturers
Vehicle manufacturing companies established in 1963